Full Time Love is an album by the American soul singer Ann Peebles, released in 1992. Peebles supported the album by touring with Otis Clay.

Production
The album was produced by Ron Levy. It marked a reunion between Peebles and the Hi Rhythm Section; the Memphis Horns also played on the album. About half the album's songs were cowritten by Peebles.

Critical reception

The Orlando Sentinel wrote that Levy "gives the album a bluesier feel than Peebles' old albums, and she shows plenty of blues feeling on Robert Ward's 'Fear No Evil' and Delbert McClinton's 'Read Me My Rights', a number floating on a wash of organ chords and embellished with horns and gospel-style piano." Rolling Stone thought that "Peebles's small but steely voice has grown stronger, richer and more sinuous in the twenty-odd years since her last album."

USA Today praised the "yearning reinterpretation of the Rolling Stones' 'Miss You' and [the] stark reprise of 'I Can't Stand the Rain'." The Toronto Star called Peebles "like Tina Tuner without the raunch."

AllMusic wrote: "Gritty, unpretentious and hard-hitting, this magnificent date throws pop and urban contemporary considerations to the wind and screams 'Memphis soul' in no uncertain terms."

Track listing

References

Ann Peebles albums
1992 albums